Haruki Junior Kanashiro Culquimboz (born 11 September 1977 in Lima) is a Peruvian footballer who plays as a goalkeeper.

Club career
Kanashiro started out his career in 2000 with Deportivo AELU, playing for them until 2003.

Then he would have a spell with Sport Ancash in 2004. The following year he joined La Peña Sporting and featured for them until 2008.

Then in January 2009 Kanashiro joined León de Huánuco. He played eight matches in the National Stage in Huánuco's championship win of the 2009 Copa Perú.

The following season, he made his league debut in the Torneo Descentralizado under manager Franco Navarro.

References

1977 births
Living people
Footballers from Lima
Peruvian people of Japanese descent
Association football goalkeepers
Peruvian footballers
Sport Áncash footballers
Sport Boys footballers
León de Huánuco footballers
Peruvian Primera División players